Mikko Lankinen is a Finnish musician. He plays lead guitar for the Finnish surf rock group Laika & the Cosmonauts and instrumental rock group The Potatoes. The lead singer for the Finnish progressive metal group Scenery Channel is also called Mikko Lankinen but they are not the same person.

References 

Finnish male musicians
Year of birth missing (living people)
Living people